Łobżenica  is a town in Piła County, Greater Poland Voivodeship, Poland, with 3,211 inhabitants (2004).

History

Łobżenica dates back to the 11th century. It prospered due to its location between Gdańsk Pomerania and central Poland. It was granted town rights before 1438, most likely in the 14th century by King Ladislaus the Short or Casimir III the Great of the Piast dynasty. Łobżenica was a private town located in the Nakło County in the Kalisz Voivodeship in the Greater Poland Province of the Kingdom of Poland. It was ravaged by the Teutonic Knights in 1431 and 1457. The town prospered thanks to crafts, brewing and trade. Local merchants participated in trade with large Polish cities of Poznań, Bydgoszcz, Toruń and Gdańsk, as well as other nearby towns. In 1606, Scottish merchants settled in the town. In the years 1612-1630 a mint operated in Łobżenica. In the 17th century, Łobżenica became a Reformation center under the patronage of the Grudziński family.

After the late 18th century Partitions of Poland, the town was annexed by Prussia. It was reintegrated with Poland, soon after the country regained independence in 1918.

The town had a population of 467 Jews in 1881 and 77 Jews in 1921.

Sports
The local football team is Pogoń Łobżenica, which competes in the lower leagues.

Notable people
 (1811–1889), Polish historian, teacher and insurgent
Wilhelm Arndt (1838-1895), German historian
 (1863–1939), Polish lawyer and politician, minister, First President of the Supreme Court of Poland

References

Cities and towns in Greater Poland Voivodeship
Piła County
Pomeranian Voivodeship (1919–1939)
Nazi war crimes in Poland